Gilberto García Olarte (born 27 January 1987), also known as Alcatraz is a Colombian professional footballer who plays for Cúcuta Deportivo.

Career statistics

Honours
Atlético Nacional
 Categoría Primera A (1): 2015 Finalización
 Copa Colombia (1): 2016
 Copa Libertadores (1): 2016
 Superliga Colombiana (1): 2016

Deportivo Pasto
 Categoría Primera B (1): 2011

References

External links 
  BDFA profile

Living people
1987 births
Association football defenders
Colombian footballers
Colombian expatriate footballers
Colombia international footballers
Deportes Tolima footballers
Cúcuta Deportivo footballers
Atlético Bucaramanga footballers
Deportivo Pasto footballers
Deportivo Cali footballers
Once Caldas footballers
Real Valladolid players
Independiente Medellín footballers
Atlético Nacional footballers
Águilas Doradas Rionegro players
Categoría Primera A players
Categoría Primera B players
La Liga players
Colombian expatriate sportspeople in Spain
Expatriate footballers in Spain
People from Santa Marta
Sportspeople from Magdalena Department
20th-century Colombian people
21st-century Colombian people